The ESLAND Awards (Spanish: Premios ESLAND) are an annual awards ceremony given to content creation from Spain, Latin America, and Andorra, by Spanish YouTuber and streamer David Cánovas Martínez "TheGrefg". The winners of each award are chosen by public vote and from among the top content creators in the Spanish-speaking community.

The first edition took place on January 17, 2022, at the Palau de la Música Catalana, Barcelona, and was streamed live on the streamer's Twitch channel. With more than 1 million sixty thousand viewers, it became the third most watched stream on the platform.

"ESLAND" is an acronym that refers to "España", "Latinoamérica" and "Andorra" (Spain, Latin America and Andorra).

History 
On December 4, 2021, TheGrefg announced the arrival of the Esland Awards through its Twitter account. There he detailed that it would take place on January 17 of the following year, from 18:00 to 23:00 (CET). The winner of each award would be chosen by a public vote, through the website, and the private votes of "150 of the most important content creators in the Spanish-speaking community".

The event was presented by TheGrefg himself, who called it "the most important project of his life". On the other hand, some media considered it "the Goya of Twitch" or "of the streamer world".

TheGrefg stated that in a supposed second edition, the Esland would be held in Latin America to "have worldwide coverage". It will be on 29 January 2023 at Auditorio Nacional in Ciudad de Mexico.

Categories

Streamer of the year

Best content series

Revelation streamer

Best event of the year

Best track record

Best talk show of the year

Best song of the year

Jägger of the year

Best IRL streamer

Best caster of the year

Best sports reporter

Best esports player of the year

Best roleplayer of the year

Best dance of the year

Meltdown of the year

Fail of the year

Clip of the year

Controversy 
On January 19, a clip went viral from streamer Folagor, who showed his disagreement with the nominees in the "roleplayer of the year" category, calling them "fucking bullshit". The controversy trended on Twitter with another clip, where he said that streamer Biyin, who was nominated as a "revelation streamer," became famous "for being AuronPlay's girlfriend," so he didn't understand the reason for her nomination. After other streamers spoke out on the issue, in a broadcast, Folagor apologized for his expressions, explained that Biyin's clip was "taken out of context" and, still maintaining his opinion, stressed that "it should have been other people who should have been nominated".

References

Spanish awards